Sinjeongnegeori Station is a station on the Sinjeong Branch of Seoul Subway Line 2. In English, the name of the station is "four-way junction in Sinjeong-dong."

References

Metro stations in Yangcheon District
Seoul Metropolitan Subway stations
Railway stations opened in 1996
1996 establishments in South Korea
20th-century architecture in South Korea